This is a list of people with the surname Li (李). Lǐ is the pinyin romanization of the Chinese surname written  in Chinese character. It is one of the most common surnames in China and the world, shared by more than 93 million people in China, and more than 100 million worldwide. It is often spelled as Lee in Hong Kong, Macau, Taiwan and many overseas Chinese communities. In Macau, it is also spelled as Lei. It is commonly spelled in Indonesia as Lie, and in Vietnam it is also spelled as Lý.

In history
Li Jing (李靖), general of Shang Dynasty in mythology of Chinese 
Li Er (李耳), born in Henan
Li Si (李斯), born in Henan of Chu (state), moved to Qin (state)
Li Xin (李信), general of Qin (state) during the Warring States era
Longxi Li lineage 隴西李氏
Li Guang (李廣), General of Han Dynasty, born on Longxi
Li Ling (李陵), General of Han Dynasty
Li Dian, military general under warlord Cao Cao
Li Hui, military general under warlord Liu Bei
Li Yan, Military General of the state of Shu Han
Li Te (李特), father of Li Xiong (Di people), founder of Cheng Han
Zhaojun Li lineage (赵郡李氏)
Li Mu
Li Jifu
Li Deyu
Li Yuan (李淵) the Emperor Gaozu of Tang, founder of Tang Dynasty
Li Shimin (李世民) the Emperor Taizong of Tang, emperor of Tang Dynasty 
Li Shiji, general of Tang Dynasty
Li Jing (李靖), general of Tang Dynasty, colleague of Xu Shiji (徐世勣), born in Xian
Li Bai (李白), poet of Tang Dynasty, born in Sichuan
Li Mi (李密, 582–619), general of Sui Dynasty, other name Liu Zhiyuan
Li Jinzhong (李盡忠), leader of Khitan Kingdom the later Liao Dynasty
Li Kaigu (李楷固), Adopted son to Li Jinzhong of Khitan Kingdom the later Liao Dynasty
Li Zhengji (李正己) the Li Huayu, General of Shandong during the Tang, descent of Goguryeo 
Li Na (李納), the son of Li Zhengji (李正己), descent of Goguryeo
Li Mi (李密), general at Tang Dynasty the Emperor Xuanzong of Tang
Li Guochang (李國昌), Shatuo general at Tang Dynasty
Li Keyong, son of Zhuye Chixin, founder of Jin
Li Cunxu, son of Li Keyong, founder of Later Tang
Li Siyuan, adopted son of Li Keyong, ruler of Later Tang

Government, politics, military
 Andrew Li, Hong Kong's first Chief Justice of the Court of Final Appeal
 Chuan Leekpai, former prime minister of Thailand
 Ed Lee (1952-2017), American politician and lawyer
 John Lie, Indonesian National Hero
 Lee Chen-jan, Vice Minister of Foreign Affairs of the Taiwan
 Lee Han-shen, former President of Taiwan Power Company
 Lee Hsien Loong, current Prime Minister of Singapore
 Lee Kuan Yew, former prime minister of Singapore
 Lee Li-chen, Deputy Minister of Mainland Affairs Council of the Republic of China
Lee Myung-bak, former President of South Korea
 Lee Shying-jow, former Minister of Veterans Affairs Council of the Taiwan
 Lee Shu-chuan, Deputy Mayor of Kaohsiung
 Lee Sush-der, former Minister of Finance of Taiwan
 Lee Teng-hui, former President of Taiwan
 Lee Wo-shih, former Magistrate of Kinmen County
 Lee Ying-ping, former Political Deputy Minister of Culture of the Taiwan
 Lee Ying-yuan, Taiwanese politician
 Lee Yung-te, Minister of Hakka Affairs Council of the Taiwan
 Li Ao, Taiwanese writer, ROC legislator
 Li Changchun, member of the Politburo Standing Committee of the Chinese Communist Party
 Li Dazhao, co-founder of the Chinese Communist Party
 Li Guidan (1913-1938), former Commanding Officer of the Chinese Air Force Zhihang Fighter Group (the 4th PG) during the War of Resistance-World War II
 Li Guixian (李贵鲜; born August 1937) is a retired politician of the People's Republic of China, and a former governor of People's Bank of China.
 Li Hongzhang, Qing Dynasty statesman and military general
 Li Hongzhi, founder of Falun Gong
 Li Hua, government official, Guangdong Province, PRC.
 Li Jingxi, former Premier of the Republic of China
 Li Keqiang, current Premier of the People's Republic of China
 Li Lu, businessman, dissident, former student protestor
 Li Peng (1928–2019), former Premier of the People's Republic of China
 Li Ruihuan, People's Republic of China politician
 Li Rusong, Ming Dynasty military commander
 Li Si, Chancellor of the Qin Dynasty
 Li Tianmin, Republic of China legislator and historian
 Li Xiannian, former President of the People's Republic of China
 Li Zicheng, Ming Dynasty uprising leader
 Li Zongren, vice-president and acting president of the Republic of China, general
 Martin Lee, founder of the Democratic Party of Hong Kong

Literature
Li Bai, Tang Dynasty poet
Li Yannian (李延年), musician at Han Dynasty
Li Qingzhao, Song Dynasty female writer and poet
Li Shangyin, Tang Dynasty poet
Li Yu, or Li Houzhu, poet and last ruler of the Southern Tang kingdom
Li Yu, author, dramatist
Lie Kim Hok, a Dutch East Indies (Indonesian) author and social worker
Jing-Jing Lee (李晶晶), modern Singaporean novelist
Grace Ly (born 1979), French writer and podcaster

Entertainment
Aarif Lee, Hong Kong born Chinese Canadian actor and singer.
Ali Lee, TVB actress
Ang Lee, Taiwanese film director
Angelica Lee, Malaysian Chinese film actress and pop singer
Bruce Lee, Hong Kong actor, martial artist
Brandon Lee, Chinese-American actor, son of Bruce Lee
Shannon Lee, Chinese-American actress, daughter of Bruce Lee
Lee Hoi-chuen, Cantonese opera singer and actor, Bruce Lee's father
Robert Lee, Hong Kong musician, younger brother of Bruce Lee
Charmaine Li, Hong Kong actress
China Lee, American model and actress of Chinese descent
Christopher Lee Meng Soon, Singaporean actor
Coco Lee, Chinese-American singer and actress
Daniel Lee Yan-Kong, Hong Kong film director
Danny Lee Sau-Yin, Hong Kong actor
Dick Lee, Singaporean musician and entertainer
Hacken Lee, Hong Kong-based Cantopop singer and lyricist, actor
Herman Li, guitarist from DragonForce
Ivy Lee, Singaporean actress
Jessie Mei Li, British actress
Jet Li, Chinese martial artist, actor
Johnson Lee, TVB entertainer
Kristen Li (born 2002), American child actress, known for The Powerpuff Girls
Mark Lee Kok Huang, Singaporean comedian, actor, host and director
Leanne Li, Miss Chinese Vancouver 2004 winner, Miss Chinese International 2005 winner, Hong Kong actress
Lee San-san, 1996 Miss Hong Kong Pageant winner
Levy Li, Miss Malaysia Universe 2008
Li Bingbing, Chinese actress
Li Han-hsiang, Chinese film director
Li Hongyi (actor), Chinese actor and singer. 
Li Landi, Chinese actress and model. 
Li Nanxing, Singaporean actor
Li Ning, Chinese gymnast and entrepreneur
Li Wenhan, Chinese singer and actor, member of UNIQ and UNINE
Li Yang, Chinese film director
Li Yitong (actress) (李一桐, born 1993), Chinese actress and singer
Li Yitong (singer) (李艺彤, born 1995), Chinese idol singer, actress, and member of female idol group SNH48
Li Yong, Chinese television host
Li Yu, Chinese film director
Li Yundi, pianist
Lie Tek Swie, Indonesian film director. 
Rain Lee, Hong Kong actress
Sam Lee, Hong Kong actor
Sandra Lee (born 1970), American dermatologist and YouTube personality of Chinese origin
Selena Lee, TVB actress
Zack Lee, Indonesian actor
Li Zehua (born 1995), Chinese citizen journalist, rapper, and YouTuber
Li Zhendong (李振冬, born 1982), original name of Chinese-Japanese actor Tsuyoshi Abe
Li Zhenning, Chinese singer and actor, member of UNINE

Business
Sir David Li, Chairman and Chief Executive of the Bank of East Asia in Hong Kong
Lee Hsien Yang, chairman of Fraser and Neave Limited
Kai-Fu Lee, founding president of Google China
Lee Shau-kee, Hong Kong billionaire businessman
Li Ka-shing, prominent Hong Kong billionaire businessman
Lie Mo Tie, Indonesian billionaire, known as Mochtar Riady, founder of Lippo Group
Li Bai, Indonesian billionaire, known as James Riady, chairman of Lippo Group
Li Ning, former Olympic gymnast turned entrepreneur, founder and current chairman of Li-Ning Company Limited
Martin Lee, director of Hong Kong and China Gas
Peter Lee, vice-chairman and managing director of Henderson Land Development
Richard Li, Chairman and Executive Director of PCCW
Victor Li, vice-chairman and managing director of Cheung Kong (Holdings) Limited
Lee Kong Chian, one of the founders of Oversea-Chinese Banking Corporation (OCBC) and its chairman from 1938 until his death in 1967
Lee Choon Seng, another former chairman of OCBC
Witness Lee, Christian minister

Scholars, academics, scientists
Arthur Li (李國章), surgeon and former Vice-Chancellor of the Chinese University of Hong Kong
Henry Chang-Yu Lee, forensic scientist
Heidi Li Feldman, American law professor
Tsung-Dao Lee, Nobel physicist
Wen Ho Lee, Chinese-American physicist
Yuan T. Lee, Taiwan Nobel chemist (was US citizen when receiving Nobel Prize).
Yuk-Wing Lee, MIT professor of Electrical Engineering
Li Choh-ming, Hong Kong economist and educator
Fuk Li, executive manager in the U.S. Space Program
Yueh-Ting Lee, Social psychologist
Gary Yia Lee, Hmong anthropologist
Guofang Li, Canadian psychologist
Choh Hao Li, Biochemist
Li Pei (李佩, 1917–2017), Chinese linguist and professor of English
Li Shizhen, Ming Dynasty physician and pharmacologist
Li Wenliang, Chinese ophthalmologist who warned about the COVID-19 pandemic
Li Yingshi, Chinese author
Li Zehou (1930–2021), contemporary scholar and academic, critic of the P.R.C.
Runze Li, American statistician
Susur Lee, chef
Song Li, Chinese engineer
Li Wenliang (1986–2020), Chinese ophthalmologist

Sport
Isabelle Li, Singaporean table tennis player
Lee Chih-kai, Taiwanese male artistic gymnast
Lee Chong Wei, Malaysian badminton player 
Lee Lai Shan, professional windsurfer from Hong Kong
Li Cunxin, dancer
Li Huirong, Chinese long and triple jumper
Li Na, Chinese tennis player
Li Hang, Chinese professional snooker player
Li Tie, Chinese football manager and former footballer
Li Xiaoxia, Chinese table tennis player
Li Zhe, Chinese tennis player
Haku Ri, Japanese volleyball player

Fictional characters
Ranka Lee and Ozma Lee in Macross Frontier
Lee Bailong in Shaman King 
Lee Diendou in Fighter's History 
Li Kohran in Sakura Wars 
Syaoran Li (and his 4 sisters), Meiling Li, and Yelan Li in Cardcaptor Sakura 
Li Xiangying in Angel Heart 
Li Ren in Hanasakeru Seishōnen 
Lenalee and Komui Lee in D.Gray-man
Li Xiaoyao in Chinese Paladin 
Lee in East of Eden 
Miss Lee Missee Lee 
Lee Chaolan in Tekken
Li Kouyuu in The Story of Saiunkoku 
Juniper Lee in The Life and Times of Juniper Lee
Li Mei in Mortal Kombat
Li Shan in Kung Fu Panda 3
Li Shang in Mulan
Professor Li in Okashina Okashi – Strange Candy
Wanda Li in The Magic School Bus
Meilin Lee in Turning Red

Other
Li Ang (murderer) (李昂), murderer
Li Ching-Yuen (李清雲), a Chinese herbalist and practitioner of Qigong, made a longevity claim.
Li Guangjun (born 1969), Chinese serial killer
Li Hao (murderer)
Li Pingping (李平苹), executed serial killer
Li Shikang, Chinese serial killer 
Li Xiangnan (李向南), murdered Shao Tong
Vincent Li, murdered Tim McLean
Yangjie Li, murder victim
Li Yijiang (李义江), serial killer
Li Yin, a Chinese painter, poet, and calligrapher during the late Ming and early Qing dynasties, noted for her flowers and birds
Li Zhu'er (李豬兒), An Lushan's eunuch

References 

Lists of people by surname
Chinese-language surnames